Luntinmang Haokip (born 5 December 2001) is an Indian professional footballer who plays for RoundGlass Punjab in the I-League.

Career statistics

Club

Notes

References

2001 births
Living people
Footballers from Manipur
Indian footballers
Association football forwards
RoundGlass Punjab FC players
I-League players
East Bengal Club players